Qutuqa Beki — was a 13th century chief of the Oirats who played major role on formation of Mongol Empire.

Biography 
The first mentions of Qutuqa Beki in The Secret History of the Mongols date back to 1201, when a number of rulers of the Mongol tribes, including the Oirats, swore allegiance to Jamukha and chose him as a gurkhan, pledging to fight against Genghis Khan. According to a story, he along with the Naiman king Buyruq Khan, used a jada or "thunder stone" to unleash a powerful storm on Genghis' army. But the magical ploy backfired when an unexpected wind blew the storm back at Qutuqa. Buyruq, troubled by this storm, left the alliance and retreated to the south side of the Altai Mountains. Subsequently, Genghis Khan defeated Jamukha and the Naimans, but the Oirats had not yet been conquered by the time the Mongol Empire was formed in 1206. Nevertheless, when in 1207 Genghis Khan gave his eldest son Jochi the order to conquer the "forest peoples", Qutuqa was one of the first to obey, arriving with 10,000 Oirat soldiers. He then proceeded to the khan's court and submitted personally, having received such a powerful ally, Genghis married two women from his family to Qutuqa's children, thus starting one of the most fruitful alliances in Mongol history. He led an attack on Botokhoi Targun, chieftess of Khori-Tumed but was captured. Later he was given Botokhui as his concubine after Genghis Khan led an attack on them personally and subdued.

Family 
He had at least 3 children, all married into ruling Borjigin clan, however sources differ on which son married whom:

 Toralchi Güregen — according to The Secret History of the Mongols was married Holuikhan (daughter of Jochi), but according to The Compendium of Chronicles he was given hand of Checheyigen (daughter of Genghis)
 Buqa Temür — commander of a tümen in Ilkhanate
 Chupan — married to Nomoghan, daughter of Ariq Böke and Qutuqta Khatun
 Jagir (or Chakar) — married to Manggugan Khatun, daughter of Hulagu
 Taraghai Güregen — married to Manggugan Khatun, daughter of Hulagu in levirate, then Ara Qutlugh, daughter of Möngke Temür
 Tolun Khatun — married to Jumghur before 1270s, then Tekshin (until 12 September 1271), both sons of Hulagu
 Börtö'a — married to Princess Yixiji, daughter of Genghis Khan
 Uluq
 Rachin
 Bars Buqa — married to El-Temür, daughter of Tolui and Linqgun Khatun (daughter of Kuchlug)
 Shirab and Beglamish
 Toq-Temür (unknown father) — married Emegen, daughter of Malik Temür, son of Ariq Böke
 Emegen Khatun — married to Malik Temür, son of Ariq Böke
 Elchikmish Khatun — married to Ariq Böke, then his son Nairaqu Buqa
 Ashiqtai (with Nairaqu)
 Orghana Khatun — married to Chagatai
 Güyük Khatun — married Hulagu
 Öljei Khatun — married Hulagu, then Abaqa
 Küchü Khatun — married Toqoqan
 Mengu-Timur
 Tode Mongke
 Inalchi — according to The Secret History of the Mongols was married Checheyigen (daughter of Genghis), but according to The Compendium of Chronicles he was given hand of Holuikhan (daughter of Jochi)
 Buduz
 Negütai
 Aqu Temür
 Oghul Tutmish — initially planned to marry Tolui, but after his death was married to Möngke
 Shirin
 Bichige

References 

13th-century Mongolian people
13th-century Mongol rulers
Oirats